Cuneatibacter is a rod-shaped bacterial genus from the family of Lachnospiraceae with one known species (Cuneatibacter caecimuris).

References

Lachnospiraceae
Monotypic bacteria genera
Bacteria genera